The 1955–56 season was Manchester City's 54th season of competitive football and 39th season in the top division of English football. In addition to the First Division, the club competed in the FA Cup.

First Division

League table

Results summary

FA Cup

Sixth round

Semi-final

Final

The final took place on Saturday, 5 May 1956 at Wembley and ended 3–1, with goals scored by Joe Hayes, Bobby Johnstone and Jack Dyson for Manchester City and Noel Kinsey for Birmingham City. The attendance was 100,000. The match is remembered for an incident where Manchester City goalkeeper Bert Trautmann sustained a neck injury diving at the feet of Birmingham attacker Peter Murphy; he completed the game in considerable pain, and later examination discovered he had broken a bone in his neck.

References

External links

Manchester City F.C. seasons